Thomas Jackson Walker (born 20 February 1952) is an English former association footballer who played as a midfielder for Stoke City.

Career
Walker was born in Newcastle-under-Lyme and began his career with local side Stoke City. Due to Stoke having a large number of fixtures in the 1971–72 season he made two appearances for Stoke in April 1972, away at Chelsea and Manchester United. He left Stoke at the end of the season for Burnley but failed to make an appearance and later played for non-league Yeovil Town.

Career statistics
Source:

References

1952 births
Living people
Sportspeople from Newcastle-under-Lyme
English footballers
Association football midfielders
Stoke City F.C. players
Burnley F.C. players
Yeovil Town F.C. players
English Football League players
Macclesfield Town F.C. players